Buenia is a genus of gobies native to the eastern Atlantic Ocean and the Mediterranean Sea. The name of the genus and the common name of the type species honour Fernando de Buen y Lozano  (1895-1962), the Spanish oceanographer and marine biologist.

Species
There are currently three recognized species in this genus:
 Buenia affinis Iljin, 1930 (de Buen's goby)
 Buenia jeffreysii (Günther, 1867) (Jeffrey's goby)
 Buenia massutii Kovačić, Ordines & Schliewen, 2017

References

Gobiidae